Food vessel usually refers to dishware, the vessels from which food is served and upon which it is eaten.

It may also refer to:
 cookware, the vessels in which food is cooked and prepared
 Food Vessel culture (–1700 BC)
 Food Vessel, their distinctive pottery